Raj Karan Kabir is an Indian politician and a member of 17th Legislative Assembly, Uttar Pradesh of India. He represents the Naraini (Assembly constituency) in Banda district of Uttar Pradesh. Raj Karan Kabir belong to the Koli caste of Uttar Pradesh.

Political career
Raj Karan Kabir contested Uttar Pradesh Assembly Election as Bharatiya Janata Party candidate and defeated his close contestant Bharat Lal Diwakar from Indian National Congress with a margin of 45,007 votes.

Posts held

References

Year of birth missing (living people)
Living people
Bharatiya Janata Party politicians from Uttar Pradesh
Uttar Pradesh MLAs 2017–2022